Greg Platz is an Australian former professional rugby league footballer who played in the 1970s. A Queensland and Australian international representative back row forward, he played club football for his local club, Allora Clifton Wattles. He played rep football for Toowoomba and for Qld Country.
He is the brother of fellow Kangaroo Lew Platz.
In 1977 he captain-coached Wattles.
He captained the Toowoomba Clydesdales in the late '70s. He played a lone international against New Zealand in Brisbane in 1978. He later coached the Toowoomba Clydesdales in the 1980s.

References

1950 births
Living people
Australia national rugby league team players
Australian rugby league players
Queensland rugby league team players
Rugby league second-rows
Toowoomba Clydesdales coaches
Toowoomba Clydesdales players
Wynnum Manly Seagulls players